Emanuele Montaguti (born 21 October 1993) is an Italian basketball player who last played for Feyenoord Basketbal of the Dutch Basketball League (DBL). Standing at 178 cm (5 ft 10 in), he plays as point guard. He played college basketball for the West Florida Argonauts, from 2013 until 2016.

Professional career
On 6 October 2018, Montaguti made his professional debut with Feyenoord Basketball against New Heroes Den Bosch and scored 3 points on 1-1 shooting.

References

1993 births
Living people
Dutch Basketball League players
Feyenoord Basketball players
Italian expatriate basketball people in the United States
Italian men's basketball players
Point guards
West Florida Argonauts men's basketball players